Metropolitan Railway Country Estates (MRCE) was a limited company created in 1919 to manage and develop the land owned by the Metropolitan Railway, notably in what was known as Metro-land north-west of London. 

Some of the land had been previously handled by the Surplus Lands Committee, established in the first years of the 20th century.

External links
Exploring 20th century London

Metropolitan Railway
1919 establishments in England